Denise Marie Nickerson (April 1, 1957 – July 10, 2019) was an American child actress. She is best known for her role as Violet Beauregarde in the 1971 film Willy Wonka & the Chocolate Factory. She later played Allison on The Electric Company, and had recurring roles as Amy Jennings, Nora Collins, and Amy Collins in the soap opera Dark Shadows. She retired from acting in 1978 and later worked as a receptionist and office manager.

Early life
Nickerson was born on April 1, 1957, in New York City, to Flo, a clerical worker, and Fred Nickerson, a mail carrier. The family, along with older sister Carol and her son, moved to Miami. Nickerson, at the age of two, appeared in a television commercial for a Florida heating company.  At the age of four she was discovered at a fashion show by Broadway Theatre producer Zev Buffman of drama school the Neighborhood Playhouse.

Career

Theatre
In 1962, when she was five, she was in a play of Peter Pan as Wendy's daughter starring Betsy Palmer at Miami's Coconut Grove Playhouse. Buffman selected Nickerson to go on the road with the play, first to Washington, D.C. When Denise was nine, the play ended. Her parents moved Carol and Nickerson back to New York City at 56th and Lexington in a studio apartment while they (and Shane, Carol's son), stayed with her grandmother in Massachusetts.

In 1971, Nickerson, at 13, was cast as the nymphet Lolita, replacing the original actress Annette Ferra in the ill-fated musical, Lolita, My Love during its run in Boston, which closed on the road before reaching Broadway.

Film and television
Nickerson made appearances in the 1960s on such shows as The Doctors as Kate Harris, opposite Bill Bixby in an unsold television pilot called Rome Sweet Rome, and on The New Phil Silvers Show. Nickerson's big break came in 1968 when she joined the cast of ABC Daytime's Dark Shadows, appearing as recurring characters Amy Jennings, Nora Collins, and Amy Collins from 1968 to 1970. Upon leaving Dark Shadows, she appeared in the 1971 television movie The Neon Ceiling. That year, she appeared in her signature role as gum-chewing Violet Beauregarde in Willy Wonka & the Chocolate Factory, based on Roald Dahl's novel Charlie and the Chocolate Factory.

From 1972 to 1973, Nickerson joined the cast of The Electric Company as "Allison", a member of the Short Circus music group. Producers saw the potential in her fresh face and had her sing lead on several songs, including "The Sweet Sweet Sway". She guest starred as Pamela, (one of two dates Peter Brady had on one night), in a final-season episode of The Brady Bunch titled "Two Petes in a Pod". She auditioned for the role of Regan MacNeil in The Exorcist, losing to Linda Blair. Also in 1974, Nickerson was Sophie Pennington, alongside Teddy Eccles, in the unsold television pilot If I Love You, Am I Trapped Forever?, based on M. E. Kerr's novel of the same name.

Nickerson created the role of Liza Walton on the CBS Daytime soap opera, Search for Tomorrow. She remained with the series until producers decided to age the character and make her one of the show's romantic heroines.

Later career
In 1973, Nickerson starred in the TV movie The Man Who Could Talk to Kids, opposite Peter Boyle and Scott Jacoby. In 1975 she appeared in the satiric, beauty-pageant inspired motion picture Smile, as Miss San Diego Shirley Tolstoy, also starring a young Melanie Griffith and Annette O'Toole.

Nickerson appeared in the 1978 film Zero to Sixty opposite Darren McGavin and Sylvia Miles, and the TV film Child of Glass.

Post-acting career
After turning 21 in 1978, Nickerson quit acting and subsequently discovered that her parents had squandered her prior savings from her television and film career.  Nickerson began nursing school, but ultimately worked as a receptionist and later as an office manager/accountant in a doctor's office.

Nickerson was a longtime attendee at fan conventions for both Willy Wonka and Dark Shadows.

In 2001, Nickerson appeared in the documentary Pure Imagination: The Story of Willy Wonka and the Chocolate Factory, directed by J.M. Kenny.

In later years, Nickerson appeared on television sporadically, including an appearance on an episode of the 2000–2002 version of To Tell the Truth.

In 2003, Nickerson and some of her Willy Wonka & the Chocolate Factory castmates appeared on an episode of the British television documentary series, After They Were Famous, also directed by J.M. Kenny.

In 2011, some of the Willy Wonka & the Chocolate Factory cast members, which included Nickerson, reunited for an episode of Top Chef: Just Desserts, which challenged the contestants to create an edible world of wonder. The partial Wonka cast reunited in 2011 and again in 2015 on The Today Show.

Personal life
Denise was married twice. Her first marriage was to Rick Keller in 1981; he died two years later of a brain aneurysm.  Her second marriage was to Mark Willard in 1995; they had one son, Joshua Nickerson, before divorcing in 1998.

In 1976, Nickerson was hit by a car while crossing the street and was left in a full leg cast for eight months.

Illness and death
In June 2018, Nickerson suffered a severe stroke and was hospitalized in intensive care. She was discharged to a rehabilitation center the following month. In August, she went home to live under her family's care. In September 2018, Julie Dawn Cole and Paris Themmen from Willy Wonka & the Chocolate Factory visited Nickerson after she was discharged from a rehabilitation center.

On July 8, 2019, Nickerson took an overdose of prescription medicines while her son and daughter-in-law were out; her son took her to a hospital in respiratory distress. While in intensive care, she developed pneumonia. She suffered a massive seizure the following day and slipped into a coma. She had a do not resuscitate order in place, and on July 10, her family removed her from life support. She died later that day from pneumonia.

Filmography

Film

Television

Theatre

References

Citations

Sources

External links
 
 
 

1957 births
2019 deaths
20th-century American actresses
21st-century American actresses
Actresses from New York City
American child actresses
American film actresses
American soap opera actresses
American television actresses
Drug-related deaths in Colorado